Haughton impact crater is located on Devon Island, Nunavut in far Northern Canada. Devon Island itself is composed of Paleozoic shale and siltstone overlying gneissic bedrock. When the crater formed, the shale and siltstone were peeled back to expose the basement; material from as deep as  has been identified.

Description 

At 75° north latitude, it is one of the highest-latitude impact craters known. The temperature is below the freezing point of water for much of the year, and the limited vegetation is slow-growing, leading to very little weathering. For this reason Haughton retains many geological features that lower-latitude craters lose to erosion.

Because Haughton's geology and climatology are as close to Mars-like as can be had on Earth, Haughton and its environs have been dubbed by scientists working there as "Mars on Earth." For example, the centre of the crater contains impact breccia (ejected rock which has fallen back into the impact zone and partially re-welded) that is permeated with permafrost, thus creating a close analogue to what may be expected at crater sites on a cold, wet Mars. The Mars Institute and the SETI Institute operate the Haughton–Mars Project at this site, designed to test many of the challenges of life and work on Mars. The non-profit Mars Society also operates the Flashline Mars Arctic Research Station (FMARS) at this site and conducts similar research.

References

External links 
 Devon Island & Haughton Crater – Arctic-Mars.org
 Flashline Mars Arctic Research Station (FMARS), The Mars Society

Impact craters of Canada
Impact craters of the Arctic
Eocene impact craters
Bartonian Stage
Landforms of Qikiqtaaluk Region
Devon Island